Louis Pierre Francis Malcolm Drummond (died 1833) was a French soldier of Scottish descent.

Family
He married firstly Lady Caroline Barry, daughter of Richard Barry, 6th Earl of Barrymore, and secondly Lady Caroline Mackenzie, daughter of Kenneth Mackenzie, 1st Earl of Seaforth. His son Louis Edward Genevieve (1791–1888) was also a soldier.

References

1833 deaths
Louis Pierre Francis Malcolm
French people of Scottish descent